Ejay Lasap Falcon (born 21 November 1989) is a Filipino actor, model, endorser and politician who is the vice governor of Oriental Mindoro. As an actor, he came to prominence in 2008 after winning the reality show Pinoy Big Brother: Teen Edition Plus.

In 2009, the soap Katorse, a remake of a 1980 film, gained him prominence. In 2012, he starred in a Daytime drama Mundo Man Ay Magunaw, a comics serial and the '90s film adaptation as Rominick Sarmenta. In 2016, he starred in The Greatest Love which gained Outstanding Praise for all the cast members involved. In 2017, the series The Blood Sisters gained him a new following as it reunited him with his Katorse castmates. From 2019 to 2020, he led the series SanDugo on Daytime which gave him leading man status.

Early life
According to the Pinoy Big Brother: Teen Edition Plus website, Falcon's mother left his family in Mindoro when he was little and they never heard anything from her for a long time so at the age of 15, he went to Manila to look for her, only to find out that she had another family. During his three-year stay in Manila, he went to University of Manila and took a course in Hotel and Restaurant Management but was forced to quit school because of financial problems. It was also during that time that he met his manager, showbiz hairstylist Benjie Alipio, who took him in as a talent and entered him in Circle of 10 talent search. He did not win any title in the said talent search but it served as his ticket to get guest stints in various TV shows. Falcon was a former member of the Iglesia ni Cristo.

Entertainment career

Pinoy Big Brother: Teen Edition Plus

When the second season of Pinoy Big Brother started, Falcon auditioned and got in as one of the official housemates of Pinoy Big Brother: Teen Edition Plus. Clad in a Tarzan costume, he was introduced as "Promdi Hottie of Mindoro" who had trouble with technological gadgets and elevators when he first visited Manila.

He was the first housemate to get inside the Pinoy Big Brother house.

On day 75, he was proclaimed the Big Winner—the battle between him and Pinoy Big Brother: Teen Edition Plus'''s second teen placer Robi Domingo was the closest in Pinoy Big Brother history but he emerged the winner in the end with 36.31% of votes against the latter's 34.39%. His 620,934 votes earned him a title of "Big Winner", a P1.5 million business package from the Crystal Clear water purifying company, a laptop, a kitchen showcase, a 46-inch LCD television set, a condo unit, and a cash prize of P1 million.

Upon leaving the Pinoy Big Brother: Teen Edition Plus house, Falcon was immediately plagued by intrigues. Rumors went out that votes during the Big Night were manipulated in his favor and that he did not deserve to win his title. He was also plagued with questions hinting that he used to be a callboy and that he is not a real promdi (province boy). He denied these issues and said that he leaves the decision to God to judge his detractors. Furthermore, Laurenti Dyogi, the director of Pinoy Big Brother: Teen Edition Plus, defended him from these allegations saying that he won not just because he was poor but because he changed a lot and shared himself in Pinoy Big Brother: Teen Edition Plus.

After Pinoy Big Brother
Falcon's first acting stint after Pinoy Big Brother: Teen Edition Plus, around late 2008, was when he guested in an episode of That's My Doc with fellow housemate, Valerie Weigmann. He has already guested in various TV shows of ABS-CBN and is part of the third season of TV5's Lipgloss. He also played a short role in Habang May Buhay, a primetime TV series of ABS-CBN which started airing 2010. He also made a guest appearance in ABS-CBN's top-rating primetime drama series, May Bukas Pa'', last April 2009, and became a recurring cast of the said show. Finally in 2009, he played a major role as Gabby Arcanghel opposite Erich Gonzales in ABS-CBN's drama series entitled Katorse. This was followed by another show entitled Tanging Yaman where he was one of the main cast alongside his previous co-stars in Katorse, Enchong Dee and Erich Gonzales. In 2010, he also played a major role as Xyriel Manabat's brother in the show entitled Momay. In the said show, he was paired with Queenie Padilla. In addition, he also appeared in a number of ABS-CBN's MMK and Wansapanataym episodes.

Currently, Falcon is the model/endorser of Bench, Converse, Lacoste, Afficcionado Perfumes and Fashion Exchange.

His last project was Guns and Roses in which he was paired on-screen with Empress Schuck. The show ended in September 2011 but there were rumours that Falcon was planning to court Empress and continue the romance off-screen, but the two say they are happy just being friends.

Political career 
In 2022, Falcon ran for vice governor of Oriental Mindoro, with incumbent governor Humerlito Dolor as his running mate and Falcon won.

Filmography

Television

Film

See also
 Pinoy Big Brother: Teen Edition Plus

References

External links
 

1989 births
Living people
Big Brother (franchise) winners
Pinoy Big Brother contestants
Filipino male child actors
Former members of Iglesia ni Cristo
Star Magic
ABS-CBN personalities
Filipino male models
People from Oriental Mindoro
Tagalog people
Filipino people of French descent
University of Manila alumni
Filipino actor-politicians